Andrew D. Turner (6 January 1920 – 14 September 1947) was an officer in the U.S. Army Air Forces (USAAF) and a fighter pilot and commanding officer of the all-African American 332nd Fighter Group's 100th Fighter Squadron, best known as the all-African American Tuskegee Airmen, "Red Tails," or among enemy German pilots, “Schwartze Vogelmenschen” ("Black Birdmen").

Early life
Turner was born on 6 January 1920 in the Deanwood neighborhood of Washington D.C. He was the son of Reverend Clarence Turner I, a founding member of the First Baptist Church of Deanwood.

Turner attended Deanwood Elementary and Dunbar High School in Washington, DC.

Military career

On 9 October 1942, Turner graduated from Tuskegee's cadet pilot training class 42-I-SE, receiving his wings and a commission as a 2nd Lieutenant. The U.S. Army Air Corps assigned Turner to the 332nd Fighter Group's 100th Fighter Squadron.

In June 1944, Turner became the 100th Fighter Squadron's commanding officer, after previous squadron commander, Lieutenant Robert B. Tresville, failed to return from a mission. On 18 July 1944, he was credited with damaging a German Me-109 aircraft. During World War II, he flew a total of 69 missions.

He returned to the U.S. on 10 June 1945 and on 17 July became the deputy commander of the 477th Fighter Group at Godman Army Airfield which was training in preparation for deployment to the Pacific Theater. After the war Turner stayed in the USAAF and continued to serve in the 477th as it moved to Lockbourne Army Airfield in March 1946. With the reorganization of the 477th into the 332nd Fighter Group and then the 332nd Fighter Wing in mid-1946 he became the Wing's operations and training officer.

Awards
Air Medal with four oak leaf clusters
Distinguished Flying Cross.
Congressional Gold Medal (2006) awarded to the Tuskegee Airmen

Death
On 14 September 1947 Turner was killed in a mid-air collision near Lockbourne when his Republic P-47N Thunderbolt crashed into another fighter pilot's aircraft, killing both pilots. He was interred at Arlington National Cemetery.

See also
List of Tuskegee Airmen Cadet Pilot Graduation Classes
List of Tuskegee Airmen
Military history of African Americans
 Dogfights (TV series)
 Executive Order 9981
 The Tuskegee Airmen (movie)

Notes

References

External links
 Fly (2009 play about the 332d Fighter Group)
Herman A. Lawson Black Eagles
Tuskegee Airmen at Tuskegee University
 Tuskegee Airmen Archives at the University of California, Riverside Libraries.
 Tuskegee Airmen, Inc.
 Tuskegee Airmen National Historic Site (U.S. National Park Service) 
 Tuskegee Airmen National Museum

1920 births
1947 deaths
Tuskegee Airmen
United States Army Air Forces officers
Military personnel from Tuskegee, Alabama
African-American aviators
Military personnel from Washington, D.C.
People from Washington, D.C.
Recipients of the Distinguished Flying Cross (United States)